Eastern Kentucky University (Eastern or EKU) is a public university in Richmond, Kentucky. As a regional comprehensive institution, EKU also maintains branch campuses in Corbin, Hazard, Lancaster, and Manchester and offers over 40 online undergraduate and graduate options.

History

Founding 
Central University was founded in 1874 in Richmond, Kentucky. Beset with financial difficulties and small enrollment, Central University consolidated with Centre College in 1901. 

On March 21, 1906, the Governor signed legislation which established the Eastern Kentucky State Normal School No. 1. On May 7,1906, the Normal School Commission selected the site of the former Central University campus as the location of the Eastern Kentucky State Normal School No. 1; the site continues to serve as the location of EKU.

Renaming 
In 1922, "Eastern Kentucky State Normal School No. 1" changed its name to "Eastern Kentucky State Normal School and Teachers College;" the College awarded its first degrees under that name in 1925. In 1930, "Eastern Kentucky State Normal School and Teachers College" changed its name to "Eastern Kentucky State Teachers College." In 1948, the General Assembly removed the word "Teachers" from the school's name. In 1966, the institution was officially renamed Eastern Kentucky University.

Campus revitalization 
The years since 2012 have been marked by a building campaign that has altered the campus layout and improved aesthetics.  Funding for the multimillion dollar project has relied heavily on public-private partnerships (P3) under the leadership of then-President Michael T. Benson.  The recent construction efforts at the university mark the most significant period of campus facility development since President Robert R. Martin's tenure in the 1960s.  Among the renovations and additions are:

Powell Student Center (2019–20)
New Rec Center (2019–20)
Case Dining Hall (2018)
New Science Building (Phase II) (2017)
New Earle Combs Stadium (Baseball Field) (2017)
New Gertrude Hood Stadium (Softball Field) (2017)
Carloftis Garden (2017)
New Martin Hall (2017)
North Hall (previously known as New Hall B) (2017)
Scholar House (2017)
Parking Garage (2017)
Turner Gate (2016)
John Grant Crabbe Main Library's Noel Reading Porch (2015)
Lancaster Avenue Pedway (2015/2017)
Hummel Planetarium upgrades (2015)
1971 Verdin Carillon bells (Keen Johnson Building) (2014)
New Hall 2013
New Science Building (Phase I) (2012)

Academics

Accreditation and academic charge 
In 1922, it became a four-year institution.

In 1928, the college received its initial accreditation from the Southern Association of Colleges and Schools. As of 2022, the university is accredited.

In 1935, Eastern added graduate studies. In 1948, the state legislature granted the college the right to award nonprofessional degrees. 

In 2010, the University awarded its first doctoral degree through its Educational Leadership and Policy Studies program. 

EKU serves its service region by offering adult degree completion options and online degree programs in addition to its traditional on-campus offerings.

Rankings

Eastern Kentucky University has achieved national recognition, including mostly recently by the U.S. News & World Report 2022 Rankings:
 #52 (tie) in Regional Universities South (51st in 2021)
 #29 Best Graduate School – Occupational Therapy (29th in 2021)
 #170 (tie) Best Graduate School – Public Affairs (166th in 2021)
 #189 Best Graduate School – Speech-Language Pathology (189th in 2021)
 #74 (tie) Best Online Bachelor's Programs (58th in 2021)
 #24 Best Colleges for Veterans (32nd in 2021)

EKU was also ranked by the 2019 Forbes Magazine America's Top Colleges:

 #641 Top Colleges (637 in 2017 and 647 in 2018)
 #248 in Public Colleges (249 in 2017 and 250 in 2018)
 #160 in the South (172 in 2017 and 167 in 2018)

Honors program
In 1987, the faculty senate voted to approve an honors program to attract high-achieving students primarily from Kentucky.  The Board of Regents approved the proposal on January 16, 1988.  The first 34 students entered the program in the fall semester of 1988 under the direction of Dr. Bonnie Gray, a professor of philosophy. The curriculum is interdisciplinary and capped by a senior thesis project. Students who successfully complete all program requirements receive the "Honors Scholar" designation on their diplomas.

Each year, the honors program sends the largest delegation to the annual National Collegiate Honors Council Conference to present their research.  Additionally, students in the program have received awards, including the Fulbright. Truman, Mitchell, and Phi Kappa Phi.

In 2020, the program consisted of five full-time staff and approximately 496 students.

Student life
There are more than 230 registered, active student organizations on campus including the Student Government Association (SGA) and numerous fraternities and sororities.

Student Government Association
The SGA is the formal student governing body of the University. Founded in 1954, the organization consisted of the Student Council (which became the Student Senate in 1971). Currently, the SGA consists of three independent and equal branches: the Student Court, Executive Branch, and Student Activities Council. Additionally, an Advisory Board of University employees provides advice and oversight. 

Every student enrolled in classes at the University is considered a member of the SGA.

Greek life

Traditions
Among EKU's most prominent traditions is the rubbing of Daniel Boone's left foot for good luck; the statue features prominently in front of the Keen Johnson Building.

More recently, former President Benson initiated the Welcome Walk at the beginning of the fall semester; first year students gather in front of Keen Johnson Building with the President before walking along University Drive and passing through the new Turner Gate.

Athletics

The Eastern Kentucky (EKU) athletic teams are called the Colonels (formerly known as the "Maroons" until the mid-1960s). The university is a member of the NCAA Division I ranks, primarily competing in the ASUN Conference since the 2021–22 academic year; while its football team competes in the Western Athletic Conference (WAC) until the ASUN launches its own football league, most likely in the 2022 fall season. The Colonels previously competed in the Ohio Valley Conference (OVC) from 1948–49 to 2020–21. EKU competes in 18 intercollegiate varsity sports: Men's sports include baseball, basketball, cross country, football, golf, tennis and track & field; while women's sports include basketball, beach volleyball, cross country, golf, soccer, softball, tennis, track & field and volleyball.

Accomplishments
The school is best known for its Football Championship Subdivision football team, which has captured 22 OVC conference titles and two Division I-AA National Championships in 1979 and 1982. Much of the success came during the long tenure of head coach Roy Kidd from 1964 to 2002. Kidd, with a career coaching record of 314-124-8, is a member of the College Football Hall of Fame. Now led by first-year coach Walt Wells, the Colonels returned to the national FCS playoffs in 2011.

The Eastern Kentucky University men's basketball team won the Ohio Valley Conference tournament championship and its automatic bid to the NCAA basketball tournament in 2005, 2007, and 2014.

The men's and women's cross country team has also been a staple of success over the recent decade. The men's team has won all ten of the last ten OVC Championships, and the women have won nine of the last ten. In 2011 the men's cross country team qualified for NCAA National Cross Country Meet for the first time in school history. Since 2011, the team has qualified for the NCAA National Cross Country Meet five consecutive times.

Media

WEKU

Launched in 1968, WEKU is a charter member of the educational radio network, National Public Radio (NPR). WEKU features NPR news and talk programming in addition to locally produced news, arts and cultural programming.  

WEKU broadcasts across nine FM stations in Central and Eastern Kentucky:  

 88.9 FM Richmond /Lexington
 90.9 FM Hazard
 88.5 FM Corbin
 90.1 FM Pineville
 106.7 FM Frankfort 
 96.3 FM Harlan
 96.9 FM Barbourville
 95.1 FM Pikeville
 102.5 FM Middlesboro
WEKU also has a 24-hour classical musical channel which can be accessed via its website and mobile app.

The Eastern Progress
The Eastern Progress, also known as The EP, began in February 1922 and serves as the official student newspaper.

Notable alumni

 Josh Anderson – (baseball) former center fielder, Cincinnati Reds
 Bob Babbage - Kentucky politician
 Yeremiah Bell – (football) retired, Miami Dolphins, New York Jets, Arizona Cardinals
 Eula Bingham – occupational health scientist
 Elmo Boyd – (football) former wide receiver, San Francisco 49ers and Green Bay Packers
 Chad Bratzke – (football) former defensive end, New York Giants and Indianapolis Colts
 Dwight Butler – member of Kentucky House of Representatives representing the 18th District
 John "Bam" Carney – educator/coach; member of Kentucky House of Representatives representing the 51st District
 Wally Chambers – (football) former defensive tackle, Chicago Bears and Tampa Bay Buccaneers. Winner of 1973 Defensive NFL Rookie of the Year Award
 Sam Champion – weather editor/anchor for "Good Morning America" and ABC News; former weather forecaster for WABC-TV
 Tom Colbert – first African-American Oklahoma Supreme Court Justice (M.Ed.)
 Earle Combs – (baseball) former New York Yankee teammate of Babe Ruth and Lou Gehrig, member of the Baseball Hall of Fame
 Danny Copeland – (football) defensive back, Washington Redskins. Starter on the Redskins Super Bowl XXVI champions. Currently a motivational speaker in Meigs, Georgia.
 Dale Dawson – (football) placekicker; Minnesota Vikings, Philadelphia Eagles, and Green Bay Packers
 Jessamyn Duke – professional mixed martial artist formally for the UFC
 Jason Dunn – (football) tight end, Kansas City Chiefs
 Alecia Webb-Edgington – former executive director, Kentucky Office of Homeland Security; member of Kentucky House of Representatives representing the 63rd District
 George Floyd – (football) defensive back, New York Jets, member of the College Football Hall of Fame
 Danny Ford – House Republican Whip, member of Kentucky House of Representatives representing the 80th District
 Christian Friedrich – (baseball) starting pitcher, free agent
J. Dudley Goodlette (born 1948), politician and lawyer
 Myron Guyton – (football) defensive back, New York Giants and New England Patriots. Starter on Giants Super Bowl XXV champions. Currently a businessman in Atlanta.
 Ole Hesselbjerg – 2016 Rio summer Olympian
Silas House – writer best known for his novels.
 Carl Hurley – humorist and motivational speaker; former EKU professor.
 Chris Isaac – (football) CFL's Most Outstanding Rookie Award in 1982
 John Jackson – (football) former NFL tackle (171st person in NFL history to play in at least 200 games)
 Aaron Jones – (football) former NFL defensive end
 Roy Kidd – (football/baseball) eighth-winningest coach in college football history, two-time NCAA National Champion (1979 and 1982). Member of the College Football Hall of Fame
 Kim King – member of  Kentucky House of Representatives representing the 55th House District
 Laura Kirkpatrick – runner up of America's Next Top Model Cycle 13
Homer Ledford – former bluegrass musician and member of the Cabin Creek Band
 Lee Majors – (attended as Harvey Yeary) Six Million Dollar Man, The Fall Guy  (1962, History/Physical Education)
 Antwaun Molden – (football) 3rd-round (79th overall) pick of the Houston Texans in 2008 NFL Draft
 Virgil Moore - former member of the Kentucky State Senate
 Dan Patrick – co-host of ESPN's SportsCenter, attended EKU for two years on a basketball scholarship.
 Steve Pence – former Lieutenant Governor and Justice Secretary of Kentucky
 Dallas Robinson - Kentucky's sole Army veteran Olympian from 2014 Olympics. Team USA athlete for two years with USA rugby team and four with USA bobsled team. In 2008 was ranked 1st in world in the 55m dash, indoor track and field. EKU Hall of Fame. High School Track and Field Coach hall of fame.
 Thaksin Shinawatra – former Prime Minister of Thailand (1975, M.S. in criminal justice)
 Garfield Smith – (basketball) former NBA and ABA player
 Teddy Taylor – (football) 1969 Milestone Outstanding Athlete, two-time All-American, OVC All-Time Team, 1978 Southeastern Kentucky Football Conference Coach of the Year, inducted into EKU Hall of Fame, named 2013 "Man of the Year" for Richmond, KY.
 Ken Upchurch – member of Kentucky House of Representatives from District 52 in Wayne County
Corey Walden – professional basketball player, 2019 Israeli Basketball Premier League MVP
 Crystal Wilkinson – writer, poet, educator, and winner of 2016 Ernest J. Gaines Award for Literary Excellence

References

External links

 
 Official athletics website

 
Universities and colleges accredited by the Southern Association of Colleges and Schools
Educational institutions established in 1906
1906 establishments in Kentucky
Public universities and colleges in Kentucky
Richmond, Kentucky
Education in Madison County, Kentucky